Lee Van Atta (July 22, 1922 – February 15, 2002) was an American child actor between 1936 and 1939.

Filmography

References

External links

The Serial Squadron

American male film actors
American male child actors
Male film serial actors
20th-century American male actors
1922 births
2002 deaths